Farfa is an Italian name which can refer to:

A place name in the province of the Lazio in Italy, as:
 Farfa River, a river of the province of Rieti
 Farfa Abbey, one of the main medieval abbeys in Italy
 Farfa (village), a little village located around the abbey
 A personal name, as:
 Farfa (poet), an Italian Futurist poet (1881–1964)